Nikolay Yakovlevich Smaga (22 August 1938 – 29 March 1981) was a Soviet athlete from Ukraine who competed mainly in the 20 kilometer walk. He trained at VSS Trud in Penza and later at VSS Avanhard in Kiev.

He competed for the USSR in the 1968 Summer Olympics held in Mexico City, Mexico in the 20 kilometer walk where he won the bronze medal. He was awarded the Order of the Badge of Honor (1968). He was born in Bobrove, Sumy Oblast and died in Kiev.

References

 Biography and photo

1938 births
1981 deaths
Ukrainian male racewalkers
Soviet male racewalkers
Olympic athletes of the Soviet Union
Olympic bronze medalists for the Soviet Union
Athletes (track and field) at the 1968 Summer Olympics
Athletes (track and field) at the 1972 Summer Olympics
European Athletics Championships medalists
Medalists at the 1968 Summer Olympics
Olympic bronze medalists in athletics (track and field)
World Athletics Race Walking Team Championships winners
Sportspeople from Sumy Oblast